The Premier League Knockout Cup was a motorcycle speedway Knockout Cup competition in the United Kingdom between 1995 and 2016, governed by the Speedway Control Bureau (SCB).

History
The teams from the Premier League, the top tier of league racing between 1995 and 1996 competed in the competition before they switched to the Elite League Knockout Cup. The second tier teams then exclusively competed in the competition from 1997 until 2016. Similar competitions were staged between teams in the two divisions of the British League. The last winners of the Knockout Cup were the Glasgow Tigers who gained a 104–76 aggregate victory over the Newcastle Diamonds over two legs. The competition was organised by the British Speedway Promoters' Association (BSPA).

Competition format
The competition was run on a knockout principle; teams drawn together race home and away matches against each other, with the aggregate score deciding the result. In the event of the aggregate score being level, the teams again race home and away against each other until the tie is decided by an aggregate win. With the current 14 teams, 12 teams will be drawn into the first round, with two other teams receiving a bye into the next round. Each round is contested with a home and away leg, with the winner on aggregate qualifying for the next round.

Winners

Note
The 1995 and 1996 competition was for tier one teams following the merger of the division one and two leagues.

See also
Knockout Cup (speedway) for full list of winners and competitions

References

External links
British Speedway Promoters' Association website

Speedway competitions in the United Kingdom